Pilia is a genus of spider. Pilia may also refer to
Pilia, Togo, a village 
Pilia (gens), a plebeian family in ancient Rome 
Pilia (surname)